Anthony Valentine Howe (born 14 February 1939) is an English former professional footballer who played as a winger for Football League clubs Colchester United and Essex rivals Southend United.

References

External links
 
 Tony Howe at Colchester United Archive Database

1939 births
English footballers
Sportspeople from Colchester
Colchester Casuals F.C. players
Colchester United F.C. players
Haverhill Rovers F.C. players
Southend United F.C. players
F.C. Clacton players
Living people
Association football wingers